Atlantic Peak, elevation , is a summit in the Tenmile Range of central Colorado. The peak is southwest of Breckenridge in the Arapaho National Forest. Its summit is visible close by to the northwest from the summit of Quandary Peak, a popular 14er in Colorado. It is often hiked together with nearby Pacific Peak.

See also

List of Colorado mountain ranges
List of Colorado mountain summits
List of Colorado fourteeners
List of Colorado 4000 meter prominent summits
List of the most prominent summits of Colorado
List of Colorado county high points

References

External links

Mountains of Colorado
Mountains of Summit County, Colorado
North American 4000 m summits